Peter S. Goodman is an American economics journalist and author. Goodman has worked for The Washington Post and The Huffington Post, was the editor of the International Business Times, and is currently the European economics correspondent for The New York Times.

Biography
Goodman graduated from Reed College in 1989. His newspaper career started in Kyoto writing for the Japan Times before he became a freelancing Southeast Asia correspondent for a number of newspapers, including the Los Angeles Times, Dallas Morning News, Miami Herald and London's Daily Telegraph.  He returned to the US in 1993 writing for the Anchorage Daily News covering, among others, early on the career of Sarah Palin. After getting a master's degree in Asian studies at the University of California, Berkeley he came to The Washington Post in 1999. As the Posts economic correspondent, he undertook extensive travels to Southeast Asia, Middle East, Africa, Australia, and Europe. In 2007 he joined The New York Times as a national correspondent and  wrote about the financial crisis of 2008. A major contribution, The Reckoning, was a finalist for the Pulitzer Prize and received a Gerald Loeb Award in 2009 for Large Newspapers. He received another Gerald Loeb Award in 2014 for Commentary.

In his book Past Due, Goodman analyzes the lot of the U.S. worker who finds that his/her financial situation has not been improved over the last 15 years, namely “(b)y the fall of 2008, most American workers were bringing home roughly the same weekly wages they had earned in 1983, after accounting for inflation."  

His move from a respected position at a major traditional newspaper to the web-based The Huffington Post was noted. Howard Kurtz wrote that Goodman indicated that at The New York Times he found himself engaged in "almost a process of laundering my own views, through the tried-and-true technique of dinging someone at some think tank to say what you want to tell the reader."

Books
 Goodman, PS: Past Due: The End of Easy Money and the Renewal of the American Economy (Times Books, 2009), selected as an Editor's Choice title by the New York Times Book Review and as one of Bloomberg's Top 50 Business Books.
 Davos man: how the billionnaires devoured the world, Custom house, 2022.

References

External links
  Peter Goodman, Website
 Articles by PG for the NYT 

Living people
Reed College alumni
Year of birth missing (living people)
American non-fiction writers
The New York Times writers
Gerald Loeb Award winners for Large Newspapers
Gerald Loeb Award winners for Columns, Commentary, and Editorials